Microestola is a genus of longhorn beetles of the subfamily Lamiinae.

Species 
Microestola contains the following species:

 Microestola bidentata Gressitt, 1940
 Microestola flavolineata Breuning, 1956
 Microestola formosana Gressitt, 1951
 Microestola interrupta Gressitt, 1951
 Microestola parallela Gressitt, 1951

References 

Desmiphorini
Cerambycidae genera